Botticino is a town and comune (commune or municipality) in the province of Brescia, in Lombardy, Italy. The comune was created in 1928 by the union of the former comuni of Botticino Mattina and Botticino Sera which today, together with San Gallo, are classified as the municipality's three frazioni.

Neighbouring communes are Brescia, Nave, Nuvolera, Rezzato and Serle. It lies directly northeast of Brescia. It gave its name to marmo botticino, a valuable sedimentary limestone. Botticino is also a DOC of Lombardian wine.

Notable people
 Pio Chiaruttini (1901–1985), businessman and inventor
 Benedetto Castelli (1578–1643), mathematician
 Paolo Bolpagni (b. 1981), art historian, critic, and creator
 Giovanni Paolo Maggini ( 1580 –  1630), violin and cello maker

Sources

External links

Cities and towns in Lombardy